Fu'an railway station is a railway station located in Fu'an, Ningde, Fujian Province, China, on the Wenzhou–Fuzhou railway which operated by China Railway Nanchang Group, China Railway Corporation. This is a passenger and freight station.

References

Railway stations in Fujian
Railway stations in China opened in 2009